A millisecond pulsar (MSP) is a pulsar with a rotational period less than about 10 milliseconds. Millisecond pulsars have been detected in radio, X-ray, and gamma ray portions of the electromagnetic spectrum. The leading theory for the origin of millisecond pulsars is that they are old, rapidly rotating neutron stars that have been spun up or "recycled" through accretion of matter from a companion star in a close binary system. For this reason, millisecond pulsars are sometimes called recycled pulsars.

Millisecond pulsars are thought to be related to low-mass X-ray binary systems. It is thought that the X-rays in these systems are emitted by the accretion disk of a neutron star produced by the outer layers of a companion star that has overflowed its Roche lobe. The transfer of angular momentum from this accretion event can theoretically increase the rotation rate of the pulsar to hundreds of times per second, as is observed in millisecond pulsars.

There has been recent evidence that the standard evolutionary model fails to explain the evolution of all millisecond pulsars, especially young millisecond pulsars with relatively high magnetic fields, e.g. PSR B1937+21. Bülent Kiziltan and S. E. Thorsett (UCSC) showed that different millisecond pulsars must form by at least two distinct processes. But the nature of the other process remains a mystery.

Many millisecond pulsars are found in globular clusters. This is consistent with the spin-up theory of their formation, as the extremely high stellar density of these clusters implies a much higher likelihood of a pulsar having (or capturing) a giant companion star.  Currently there are approximately 130 millisecond pulsars known in globular clusters. The globular cluster Terzan 5 contains 37 of these, followed by 47 Tucanae with 22 and M28 and M15 with 8 pulsars each.

Millisecond pulsars, which can be timed with high precision, have a stability comparable to atomic-clock-based time standards when averaged over decades. This also makes them very sensitive probes of their environments. For example, anything placed in orbit around them causes periodic Doppler shifts in their pulses' arrival times on Earth, which can then be analyzed to reveal the presence of the companion and, with enough data, provide precise measurements of the orbit and the object's mass. The technique is so sensitive that even objects as small as asteroids can be detected if they happen to orbit a millisecond pulsar. The first confirmed exoplanets, discovered several years before the first detections of exoplanets around "normal" solar-like stars, were found in orbit around a millisecond pulsar, PSR B1257+12. These planets remained, for many years, the only Earth-mass objects known outside of the Solar System. One of them, PSR B1257+12 D, has an even smaller mass, comparable to that of the Moon, and is still today the smallest-mass object known beyond the Solar System.

Pulsar rotational speed limits 

The first millisecond pulsar, PSR B1937+21, was discovered in 1982 by Backer et al. Spinning roughly 641 times per second, it remains the second fastest-spinning millisecond pulsar of the approximately 200 that have been discovered. Pulsar PSR J1748-2446ad, discovered in 2004, is, as of 2023, the fastest-spinning pulsar currently known, spinning 716 times per second.

Current theories of neutron star structure and evolution predict that pulsars would break apart if they spun at a rate of c. 1500 rotations per second or more, and that at a rate of above about 1000 rotations per second they would lose energy by gravitational radiation faster than the accretion process would accelerate them.

In early 2007 data from the Rossi X-ray Timing Explorer and INTEGRAL spacecraft discovered a neutron star XTE J1739-285 rotating at 1122 Hz. The result is not statistically significant, with a significance level of only 3 sigma. While it is an interesting candidate for further observations, current results are inconclusive.  Still, it is believed that gravitational radiation plays a role in slowing the rate of rotation. One X-ray pulsar that spins at 599 revolutions per second, IGR J00291+5934, is a prime candidate for helping detect such waves in the future (most such X-ray pulsars only spin at around 300 rotations per second).

References

External links

"How Millisecond Pulsars Spin So Fast". Universe Today.
"Fast-Spinning Star Could Test Gravitational Waves". New Scientist.
"Astronomical whirling dervishes hide their age well". Astronomy Now.
Audio: Cain/Gay - Pulsars Astronomy Cast - Nov 2009.

Millisecond pulsar